Milton Erwin Kahl (March 22, 1909 – April 19, 1987) was an American animator. He was one of (and often considered the most influential of) Walt Disney's supervisory team of animators, known as Disney's Nine Old Men.

Biography 
Kahl was born in San Francisco, California, to Erwin, a saloon bartender, and Grace Kahl. He had three younger sisters, Dorothy, Marion, and Gladys. He would often refine character sketches from Bill Peet, incorporating ideas of Ken Anderson. The final look of many characters in the Disney films was designed by Kahl, in his angular style inspired by Ronald Searle and Picasso. He is revered by contemporary masters of the form such as Andreas Deja, and also Brad Bird, who was his protégé at Disney in the early 1970s. In the behind-the-scenes feature "Fine Food and Film" shown on the Ratatouille DVD, Bird referred to Kahl as "tough," but in a gentle way, as he often gave Bird advice on where he could improve in animation whenever he came up short. Bird later repeated this in "The Giant's Dream" documentary on the Blu Ray for The Iron Giant.

In the book The Animator's Survival Kit, the author Richard Williams makes repeated references and anecdotes relating to Kahl, whom he befriended during his early years in the animation industry. The centenary of Kahl's birth was honored by the Academy on April 27, 2009, with a tribute entitled "Milt Kahl: The Animation Michelangelo" and featured Brad Bird as a panelist.

On April 19, 1987, Kahl died of pneumonia, aged 78, in Mill Valley, California.

Filmography

References

Bibliography

External links 
 
 Disney Legends
 "King Kahl: A personal look at Disney's master animator, Milt Kahl" by Floyd Norman (JimHillMedia.com)
 A Milt Kahl lecture at CalArts from 1976 on The Animation Podcast
Interview with Kahl by Michael Barrier and Milton Gray

1909 births
1987 deaths
20th-century American artists
Artists from San Francisco
Animators from California
California Republicans
Deaths from pneumonia in California
Walt Disney Animation Studios people